Nikolay Grigoryevich Shulginov (Russian: Николай Григорьевич Шульгинов; born 18 May 1951) is a Russian statesman who is currently the Minister of Energy as of 20 November 2020. He was the chairman of the board of management and a General Director of PJSC RusHydro from 15 September 2015 to 10 November 2020.

According to Kommersant, Shulginov entered the top 10 Russian entrepreneurs and top managers in terms of the number of publications in the media in a positive tone at the end of 2020.

Biography
In 1973, he graduated from the Novocherkassk Polytechnic Institute in Rostov Oblast with a degree in Power Supply to Industrial Enterprises and Cities. From 1976 to 1998, he worked at Stavropolenergo in the city of Pyatigorsk, where he held positions from engineer to head of the Central Dispatch Service. Since 1998, he worked as Deputy Director at the branch of RAO UES of Russia - the United Dispatch Administration of the North Caucasus in Pyatigorsk.

In 2002, Shulginov was invited to Moscow as a member of the Management Board, Director for Technical Audit of OJSC System Operator - UES Central Dispatch Office. In 2004 he became Deputy Chairman, and in 2009, he was promoted to First Deputy Chairman of the Management Board of System Operator.

On 15 September 2015, by the decision of the Board of Directors of PJSC RusHydro, Shulginov was elected for a five-year term as Chairman of the Management Board - General Director of RusHydro, replacing Evgeny Dod in this position. Commenting on his appointment, Shulginov called his main task at RusHydro "putting things in order in all areas of the company's activities." He was a member of the Board of Directors of PJSC Rosseti, elected on 30 June 2016. Shulginov is a candidate of Technical Sciences, and was a member of the Board of Trustees of the National Research University "MPEI".

On 9 November 2020, Shulginov was announced as a candidate for the post of Minister of Energy by Mikhail Mishustin. On 10 November, he was appointed the Minister of Energy.

References

1951 births
Living people
21st-century Russian politicians
Russian economists
People from Alexandrovsky District, Stavropol Krai
Recipients of the Order of Honour (Russia)
Recipients of the Medal of the Order "For Merit to the Fatherland" II class
Energy ministers of Russia